Via della Spiga (literally "Alley of the Ear") is one of the Italian city of Milan's top shopping streets, forming the north-east boundary of the luxurious Quadrilatero della Moda (literally, "fashion quadrilateral"), along with Via Monte Napoleone, Via Manzoni, Via Sant'Andrea and Corso Venezia.

References

External links

Sources 
 
 
 

Streets in Milan
Pedestrian streets in Italy
Tourist attractions in Milan